Strange Boarders is a 1938 British comedy thriller film, directed by Herbert Mason, produced by Edward Black for Gainsborough Pictures, and starring Tom Walls, Renée Saint-Cyr, Googie Withers and Ronald Adam.  The film is an adaptation of the 1934 espionage novel The Strange Boarders of Palace Crescent by E. Phillips Oppenheim, and was well received by critics.

Plot
A seemingly innocuous and respectable elderly lady is knocked down and critically injured by a bus on a London street.  When the police search her handbag to find out her identity, they are astonished to discover a series of top secret military blueprints.  The secret service are alerted and arrive at the hospital to question her, but she laughs in their faces before quietly dying.

The man for the job is top secret service agent Tommy Blythe (Walls), who happens to be on honeymoon with new wife Louise (Saint-Cyr).  He is summoned back to London under conditions of absolute secrecy, not allowed to divulge any details even to Louise, who naturally does not believe his unconvincing cover story and jumps to the conclusion that he is having an affair.

Enquiries lead to the Notting Hill boarding house where the dead woman lived and Tommy takes a room there incognito to try to infiltrate what is assumed to be a nest of spies.  Louise follows him to London and confronts him, and he is forced against orders to take her into his confidence.  She also takes a room and the couple pretend not to know each other, giving their names as a Mr. Bullock and a Miss Heffer.  Together they set about the task of observing and investigating the sundry assortment of fellow lodgers, knowing that some are completely innocent while others harbour dark and treacherous secrets which threaten the very nation.  From the grasping landlady Mrs. Dewar (Irene Handl) and the meek maid Elsie (Withers), through to fellow boarders including a blind man (Adam), a Boer War colonel and his wife apparently in retirement, a travelling salesman, a scatty old biddy and a merchant of Argentinian meat, all come under suspicion before the wily pair of sleuths manage to untangle the web of lies and false leads to reveal who in the household is or is not a traitor.

Cast

 Tom Walls as Tommy Blythe
 Renée Saint-Cyr as Louise Blythe
 Googie Withers as Elsie
 Ronald Adam as Barstow
 C. V. France as Col. Lionel Anstruther
 Nina Boucicault as Mrs. Anstruther
 Martita Hunt as Miss Pitter
 C. Denier Warren as Fry

 Irene Handl as Mrs. Dewar
 Marda Vanne as Mrs. Greatorex
 Leon M. Lion as Luke
 Arthur Goullet as Señor Torres
 George Curzon as Sir Charles
 Tyrell Davis as Hayes
 Bryan Powley as George Gateshead

Production
Filming took place in Pinewood Studios with sets designed by the art director Walter Murton.

Reception

The Los Angeles Times described it as "a long series of laughs as well as thrills".

Halliwell's Film & Video Guide described the film as "[quite an] engaging comedy-thriller in the Hitchcock mould, with entertaining performances and incidents."

David Parkinson in Radio Times said "The spy thriller meets the bedroom farce in this sprightly British suspense comedy.

References

Bibliography

 Leitch, Thomas and Poague, Lehand. (2011). A Companion to Alfred Hitchcock. John Wiley & Sons
 Walker, John. (ed). (1998). Halliwell's Film & Video Guide 1998. HarperCollins Entertainment. 13th edition

External links 
 
 
 
 Strange Boarders at Park Circus
 Strange Boarders at AllMovie

1938 films
British spy comedy films
1930s English-language films
Films directed by Herbert Mason
Compositions by Charles Williams
1930s spy comedy films
Films based on British novels
Gainsborough Pictures films
British black-and-white films
Films shot at Pinewood Studios
Films set in London
British comedy thriller films
1930s comedy thriller films
1938 comedy films
1930s British films